Leslie Bricusse OBE (29 January 1931 – 19 October 2021) was a British composer, lyricist, and playwright who worked on theatre musicals and wrote theme music for films. He was best known for writing the music and lyrics for the films Doctor Dolittle, Goodbye, Mr. Chips, Scrooge, Willy Wonka & the Chocolate Factory, Tom and Jerry: The Movie, the songs "Goldfinger", "You Only Live Twice", "Can You Read My Mind (Love Theme)" (with John Williams) from Superman, and "Le Jazz Hot!" with Henry Mancini from Victor/Victoria.

Early life and education
Born in Pinner, Middlesex, now the London Borough of Harrow, Bricusse was educated at University College School in London and then at Gonville and Caius College, Cambridge. While at Cambridge, he was Secretary of Footlights between 1952 and 1953 and Footlights President during the following year. It was during his college drama career that he began working for Beatrice Lillie.

Career
In the 1960s and 1970s, Bricusse enjoyed a fruitful partnership with Anthony Newley. They wrote the musical Stop the World – I Want to Get Off (1961), which was the basis for a 1966 film version. Also in collaboration with Newley, Bricusse wrote the show The Roar of the Greasepaint – The Smell of the Crowd (1965) and music for the film Willy Wonka & the Chocolate Factory (1971), based on the children's book Charlie and the Chocolate Factory by Roald Dahl. For the latter, they received an Academy Award nomination for Best Original Song Score. When he collaborated with Newley, the two men referred to themselves as the team of "Brickman and Newburg", with "Newburg" concentrating mainly on the music and "Brickman" on the lyrics. Ian Fraser often did their arrangements.

Working solely as a lyricist, he collaborated with composer Cyril Ornadel on Pickwick (1963), based on Charles Dickens' The Pickwick Papers, a successful vehicle for Harry Secombe. His later collaborators included Henry Mancini (Victor/Victoria in 1982 and Tom and Jerry: The Movie in 1992) and John Williams (Home Alone in 1990 and Hook in 1991).

As composer and lyricist he scored the film, Doctor Dolittle (1967), which flopped at the box-office, receiving an Academy Award for Best Original Song ("Talk to the Animals"), and  Goodbye, Mr. Chips (1969).

Sammy Davis Jr. had hits with two songs by Bricusse, "What Kind of Fool Am I?" (from Stop the World - I Want to Get Off) and "The Candy Man" (from Willy Wonka & the Chocolate Factory) which became a No. 1 hit.

Other recording artists who recorded successful versions of his songs include Nina Simone ("Feeling Good"), Matt Monro and Frank Sinatra ("My Kind of Girl"), Shirley Bassey ("Goldfinger"), Harry Secombe ("If I Ruled the World"), Nancy Sinatra ("You Only Live Twice"), The Turtles ("A Guide for the Married Man"), Maureen McGovern ("Can You Read My Mind"), and Diana Krall ("When I Look in Your Eyes").

Bricusse partnered with George Tipton to write the opening theme of the American television sitcom It's a Living.

Pure Imagination: The World of Anthony Newley and Leslie Bricusse, devised and directed by Bruce Kimmel, opened at the Pacific Resident Theatre in Venice, California, on 7 December 2013. In 2015, it went to the St James Theatre, London.

On 29 October 2001, he was awarded the OBE for services to the film industry and the theatre from Queen Elizabeth II at a Buckingham Palace investiture ceremony.

In 2015, he released a memoir entitled Pure Imagination: A Sorta-Biography, with a foreword by Elton John.

Personal life and death
Bricusse resided in California and also had a flat in the United Kingdom next to the River Thames. He was married to Yvonne "Evie" Romain, who had a successful acting career in TV and movies, eventually starring in the 1967 film Double Trouble opposite Elvis Presley. They had a son, Adam.

Bricusse died in his sleep in Saint-Paul-de-Vence, France, on 19 October 2021, at the age of 90.

Works

Musicals
Stop the World – I Want to Get Off (with Anthony Newley) (1961) – includes "Once in a Lifetime" and "What Kind of Fool Am I?"
Pickwick – with Cyril Ornadel (1963)
The Roar of the Greasepaint – The Smell of the Crowd (with Newley) (1965) – includes "Who Can I Turn to (When Nobody Needs Me)?" and "Feeling Good"
Doctor Dolittle (1967) – includes "Talk to the Animals"
Sweet November (with Newley) (1968)
Goodbye, Mr. Chips (1969)
Scrooge (with Ian Fraser; Herbert W. Spencer, 1970) – includes "Thank You Very Much"
Willy Wonka & the Chocolate Factory (with Newley, 1971)
Beyond the Rainbow (lyrics only, 1978)
The Good Old Bad Old Days (with Newley, 1974)
Peter Pan (television, with Newley, 1976)
Victor Victoria (film with Henry Mancini, 1982)
Babes in Toyland (1986 film) (with Newley, 1986)
Sherlock Holmes: The Musical – book, music, and lyrics by Bricusse (1989)
Hook (with John Williams) (1991) – includes "When You're Alone"
Jekyll & Hyde (lyrics only, 1990/1994/1997)
Scrooge (1992 stage musical)
Victor/Victoria (1995 Broadway musical)
Doctor Dolittle (1998 stage musical)
Cyrano (2009, Tokyo, with Frank Wildhorn)
Sammy (2009) – Old Globe Theatre

Songs

"Out of Town" with Robin Beaumont (1956)
"My Kind of Girl" (1961)
"What Kind of Fool Am I?" with Anthony Newley (1963)
"Who Can I Turn To" with Anthony Newley (1964)
"Feeling Good" with Anthony Newley (1964)
"Goldfinger" (with John Barry and Anthony Newley) from Goldfinger (1964)
"A Guide for the Married Man" (with John Williams) from the film A Guide for the Married Man (1967)
"You Only Live Twice" (with Barry) from You Only Live Twice (1967)
"Two for the Road" (with Henry Mancini) from Two for the Road (1967)
"Talk to the Animals" from Doctor Dolittle (1967)
"Your Zowie Face" for film In Like Flint, music by Jerry Goldsmith (1967)
"Fill The World With Love" from Goodbye Mr. Chips (1968) originally sung by Petula Clark and also popularised by Richard Harris
"You and I" from Goodbye Mr. Chips (1968) sung by Petula Clark, Barbara Cook, and Michael Feinstein
"Thank You Very Much" from Scrooge (1970)
"Candy Man" and "Pure Imagination" (with Newley) from Willy Wonka & the Chocolate Factory (1971)
"Can You Read My Mind (Love Theme)" (with John Williams) from Superman (1978)
"Move Em Out" (with Henry Mancini) from Revenge of the Pink Panther (1978)
"Le Jazz Hot!" with Henry Mancini from Victor/Victoria (1982)
"Making Toys", "Every Christmas Eve/Santa's Theme (Giving)", "It's Christmas Again", "Patch! Natch!" and "Thank You, Santa!" (with Henry Mancini) from Santa Claus: The Movie (1985)
"Life in a Looking Glass" (with Henry Mancini) from That's Life! (1986)
"Somewhere in My Memory", "Star of Bethlehem" from Home Alone (with John Williams) (1990)
"When You're Alone", "Pick 'Em Up", "We Don't Wanna Grow Up" from Hook (with John Williams) (1991)
"Merry Christmas, Merry Christmas", "Christmas Star" (with John Williams) in Home Alone 2: Lost in New York.
"The Perfect Song" (with Andrew Lloyd Webber) for Michael Ball
"Grandma's Lullaby", "Who Needs You?" and "It Takes All Sorts" in The Land Before Time IV: Journey Through the Mists (1996)

Awards 

Academy Awards
Best Original Song, 1968 – "Talk to the Animals" from Doctor Dolittle
Best Adaptation and Original Song Score, 1982 - Victor/Victoria 
Grammy Awards
Song of the Year, 1963 – "What Kind of Fool Am I"
Songwriters Hall of Fame

Nominations

Tony Awards
Best Musical, 1963 – Stop the World – I Want to Get Off
Best Score, 1963 – "Stop the World – I Want to Get Off"
Best Score of a Musical, 1963 – "Stop the World – I Want to Get Off"
Best Score of a Musical, 1965 – "The Roar of Greasepaint – The Smell of the Crowd"
Best Book of a Musical, 1997 – "Jekyll & Hyde"
Academy Awards
Best Scoring of Music, Adaptation or Treatment, 1967 – Doctor Dolittle
Best Score of a Musical Picture (Original or Adaptation), 1969 – Goodbye, Mr. Chips
Best Original Song Score, 1970 – Scrooge
Best Original Song, 1970 – "Thank You Very Much" from Scrooge 
Best Adaptation and Original Song Score, 1971 – Willy Wonka & the Chocolate Factory'''
Best Original Song, 1986 – "Life in a Looking Glass" from That's Life!Best Original Song, 1990 – "Somewhere in My Memory" from Home AloneBest Original Song, 1991 – "When You're Alone" from HookGolden Raspberry Award
Worst 'Original' Song, 1986 – "Life in a Looking Glass" (lyrics) from That's Life!''

References

External links

1931 births
2021 deaths
People from Pinner
Alumni of Gonville and Caius College, Cambridge
Animation composers
Best Original Music Score Academy Award winners
Best Original Song Academy Award-winning songwriters
Broadway composers and lyricists
English dramatists and playwrights
English emigrants to the United States
English lyricists
English male composers
English male dramatists and playwrights
English musical theatre composers
English musical theatre lyricists
English songwriters
Grammy Award winners
Musicians from London
People educated at University College School
Officers of the Order of the British Empire
British male songwriters